Love In Plane Sight  is a 2022 silent short film, directed by Matej Rimanić and shot by Nik Kranjec. It stars Matej Rimanić as Boy and Eva Mlakar as Girl. The film was made for the first edition of the TikTok Short Film Competition, which was organised in partnership with the 2022 Cannes Film Festival. The short film won the Grand Prix award for Best Film.

Storyline 
The Boy sees a neighboring Girl and instantly falls in love. He invites her on a date through a paper plane invite, but gets rejected so he uses his charm to get his second chance.

TikTok Short Film Competition 
In 2022, social media giant TikTok organised a short film competition inviting all of its users to create a short film, with a duration from 30 seconds to 3 minutes. 70.000 short films were submitted from 44 different countries amassing a total of 4,5 billion views. Along with the Grand Prix for Best Film, TikTok also awarded Best Editing and Best Script.

Crew 

 Director Matej Rimanić
 Writer Matej Rimanić
 Actors Matej Rimanić, Eva Mlakar
 Director of Photography Nik Kranjec
 Editor Nik Kranjec, Matej Rimanić
 Executive Producer Luka Jurinčič
 Sound Design Alen Fekonja

See also 
 Cannes Film Festival
 TikTok

References

External links